The Yema Bojun or T60 is a subcompact crossover SUV produced by the Chinese automaker Yema Auto.



Overview 

The Bojun was originally planned to be launched as the T60 subcompact crossover sitting below the previously launched Yema T70 compact crossover, and the styling was previewed by the T60 prototype unveiled during the 2017 Shanghai Auto Show. 

By December 2018, teasers of the T60 was shown, while Yema Auto was acquired by Levdeo in January 2019, by February 2019, the Yema T60 was confirmed to be named the Bojun for the Chinese domestic market.

Powertrain
Engine options for the Bojun or T60 is a 1.5 liter naturally aspirated engine and a 1.5 liter turbocharged engine. The 1.5 liter engine has a maximum power of 82kW, peak torque of 145 Nm, mated to a 5-speed manual transmission; maximum power 115 kW of 1.5T engine, peak torque is 215 Nm and mated to a CVT gearbox.

EC60
The Yema EC60, also known as the Yema Bojun EV is the electric variant of the T60 or Bojun. Levdeo also sells their own rebadged version as the Levdeo i9.

The EC60 is powered by a 115kW/270N.m electric motor and a 66kWh lithium battery, good for a 105 km/h top speed. According to officials, the EC60 is offered with two variants, with NEDC maximum cruising range of 248 miles (400km) and 285 miles (460km) respectively.

Styling controversies
The Yema Bojun is controversial in terms of styling. Despite being significantly smaller and sitting in a lower segment, the Yema Bojun heavily resembles the Geely Boyue, and even the Bojun name was made to sound similar to Boyue.

References

Cars introduced in 2017
2010s cars
Subcompact cars
Crossover sport utility vehicles
Front-wheel-drive vehicles
Cars of China
Production electric cars